The Time Travellers is a BBC Books original novel written by Simon Guerrier. It is based on the long-running British science fiction television series Doctor Who, and features the First Doctor, his Granddaughter Susan Foreman, and her two Coal Hill School teachers Barbara Wright and Ian Chesterton.

References

External links

The Cloister Library - The Time Travellers

2005 British novels
2005 science fiction novels
Past Doctor Adventures
First Doctor novels
Novels by Simon Guerrier
BBC Books books